Finding Graceland is a 1998 American film starring Harvey Keitel, Johnathon Schaech, Bridget Fonda, and Gretchen Mol. The film features a character who claims to be an alive-and-well Elvis, years after staging his death.

Premise
An eccentric drifter claiming to be Elvis Presley hitches a ride with a young man and they find themselves on an adventurous road trip to Memphis.

Cast
 Harvey Keitel as Elvis
 Jonathon Schaech as Byron Gruman
 Bridget Fonda as Ashley
 Gretchen Mol as Beatrice Gruman
 John Aylward as Sheriff Haynes
 Susan Traylor as Maggie
 Tammy Isbell as Heather
 Peggy Gormley as Fran
 David Stewart as Purvis
 Gene Kirkwood as Gene
 Christine Brokaw as Marian Burrows
 Julia Brokaw as Lilli Burrows
 Trae Thomas as The Mechanic

External links
 
 
 

1998 films
1998 drama films
American drama films
Largo Entertainment films
Films directed by David Winkler
1990s English-language films
1990s American films